Franzensfeste Fortress (literally "Franz's Fortress") is a fortress situated in the village of Franzensfeste, in South Tyrol, Italy.

Emperor Francis I began constructing the fortress in 1833. In 1838 the project was abandoned, because the area was not considered to be of sufficient importance for a fortress.

In the summer of 2008 the fortress was opened to the public for the first time as one of the locations of Manifesta 7, the European Biennial of Contemporary art.

References

Forts in Italy
Castles in South Tyrol